Adolf Knoll (17 March 1938 – 21 September 2018) was an Austrian professional football player.

Career
Knoll played for several clubs, including Wiener Sport-Club, FK Austria Wien and Alpine Donawitz. He also played for the Austria national football team earning 21 caps, scoring 2 goals.

References

External links 
 
 

1938 births
2018 deaths
Austrian footballers
Austria international footballers
FK Austria Wien players
Wiener Sport-Club players
Austrian Football Bundesliga players
Association football midfielders
SV Waldhof Mannheim managers
Austrian football managers